Zamršje   is a village in Croatia. It is connected by the D36 highway. There were 219 inhabitants living in 2001.

Populated places in Karlovac County